The New Guildford line, presently operated by South Western Railway, is a commuter line between  and . On timetables, trains on this route are advertised as going to Guildford via .

Rush hour services provide two (inbound) morning services and one (outbound) evening service non-stop between Surbiton and Waterloo.  Off-peak services run twice per hour (once on Sundays) and are slower, stopping at all intermediate stations except between Surbiton and Wimbledon.

A nominally independent company, the Guildford, Kingston and London Railway, proposed a line broadly similar to the present-day route, but joining to the District Railway at Putney Bridge. That scheme failed when the London and South Western Railway (LSWR) agreed to build the present route, including a branch from Effingham Junction to Leatherhead. It opened in 1885. The short section from Hampton Court Junction to Claygate was electrified in 1916, and from Claygate to Guildford in 1925.

History

Predecessor schemes

Guildford was first served by an LSWR branch line from Woking, which opened 1845. The London, Brighton and South Coast Railway penetrated from the east as far as Epsom in 1847, and the LSWR reached the town with its own line in 1859. In that year the Epsom and Leatherhead Railway opened: independent at first, it became jointly owned and operated by the LSWR and the LBSCR together. There remained a large area between the LSWR main line and the Guildford branch on the one hand, and Leatherhead and other places on the east side. There were numerous schemes to fill the gap with a railway line, in many cases using Cobham as the focus. In most cases the promoters were unable to raise sufficient support among investors.

Guildford, Kingston and London Railway
In 1880 a more ambitious scheme still was put forward: it was called the Guildford, Kingston and London Railway (GK&LR). It was to be a  line reaching Guildford from Fulham, nowadays Putney Bridge station, on the District Line, and then a terminus of the Metropolitan District Railway. It would run via Kingston and Surbiton, with branches in the Cobham area to Ashtead and to Bookham. The scheme must obviously have had the connivance of the Metropolitan District Railway, although that company denied direct involvement.

The GK&LR was to have its own Surbiton station alongside the LSWR station, but also make a connection to the LSWR there. It hoped to have running powers back along the Metropolitan District Railway to South Kensington, High Street Kensington, and Addison Road (later renamed Kensington Olympia). The plan was to extend existing MDR passenger train services to Guildford. At Guildford it would have an independent station, but the line would continue into the LSWR station, and have running powers to Peasmarsh Junction, where it could connect to the LBSCR to Horsham. Moreover it would have a spur towards Ash, on the LSWR Aldershot line, giving connection to the South Eastern Railway line to Reading. Obviously the LSWR objected strongly to these proposals, and in defence it proposed its own line from Hampton Court Junction to Guildford.

Comparison with the LSWR scheme
People in the Cobham area had long complained about the failure of the LSWR – seen as an unresponsive monopoly – to connect their town to the railway network. A public meeting was held there on 6 January 1881, to gauge support for the schemes. Negative views were expressed about the GK&LR scheme: it would cost about £ million, partly due to the incorporation of lengthy tunnelling east of Kingston, yet it would be built to serve a sparsely populated district. It required an impractical junction with the Metropolitan District Railway, needing passengers to continue to central London over the already congested Inner Circle line by trains stopping at each station. Most significantly, while the District Railway supposedly backed the GK&LR, it had made no commitment or assistance of any kind.

Failure of the GK&LR
Both these schemes went to the 1881 session of Parliament. Two incompatible proposals spelt great difficulty for both proponents. The GKLR supporters were made to look amateurish in Parliament, when they repeatedly expressed themselves ignorant of likely business volumes. Finally on 30 May 1881 they agreed to a compromise. The GKLR agreed to limit its proposal to the Fulham to Surbiton section, to be worked jointly by the GKLR and the LSWR. The LSWR would build its Hampton Court Junction to Guildford line. The GKLR changed its (proposed) title to the Kingston and London Railway. The two Acts were authorised on 22 August 1881.

It was necessary now for the LSWR to obtain powers to take a 50% share in the Kingston and London Railway; this was authorised by the South-Western & District (Kingston & London Railway) Act of 1882. There was a joint committee of LSWR and Metropolitan District Railway representatives. The Corporation of Kingston was displeased to be excluded from the process, and for the LSWR (for which it held negative feelings) to be in charge. The 1882 Act included powers for junctions from the new line Surbiton, Norbiton and Putney, and to make a spur to a new LSWR terminal at Pelham Street, Kensington.

The construction of the Kingston and London Railway would cost £650,000, to be shared equally between the LSWR and the K&LR shareholders. The K&LR quickly found it impossible to generate the necessary share subscriptions. An extension of time was obtained from Parliament in 1884, and in October 1885 it was decided that it was impossible to continue. The LSWR was presenting a general powers Act in 1886, and the residual Putney Bridge to East Putney section of the K&LR was included. This was simply a crossing of the River Thames, and it was incorporated into the Wimbledon and West Metropolitan Junction scheme, authorised in that Act. The remainder of the K&LR was abandoned by virtue of the same Act.

The Leatherhead branch had been removed from the 1881 Act dur to sensitivities over the line crossing Bookham Common; An LSWR Act of 30 August 1882 succeeded in reinstating the branch, this time with tunnelling to protect the common.

Construction and opening of the New Line
While all this was going on, actual construction of the Hampton Court Junction to Guildford line, which now included the link from Leatherhead to Effingham Junction, had been proceeding. Col Yolland carried out the inspection for the Board of Trade and announced that he had never seen better work. Stations were at London Road, Clandon, Horsley, Cobham, and Oxshott, and at Bookham on the Leatherhead branch. Effingham Junction station was provided on 2 July 1888. There were eleven passenger trains each way on weekdays in the first timetable; of these, five were via Leatherhead.

Leatherhead stations
The situation at Leatherhead was complicated. The LSWR station was described by them as temporary. The LBSCR went about extending from the Epsom and Leatherhead Joint Line to Dorking, and provided a new Leatherhead station, but declined (in its Act of 1863) to incorporate the short length of line between its own old and new stations into the joint line. At the beginning of 1864 the two companies agreed that the LSWR could build a short line from the termination of the joint line to the end of its new branch line from Effingham, and the LBSCR would incorporate land acquisition on the north side of its new station, for the LSWR to build its station there.

The LSWR part of this was approved by Act of 25 July 1864, and the short LSWR Leatherhead section opened on 4 March 1867, together with both new Leatherhead stations. The old station closed, and the Epsom & Leatherhead Joint Line was doubled throughout, commissioned the same day.

The twentieth century

Sluggish development
The criticism levelled at the line throughout was that it was to be built through a sparsely populated rural area. Now that it was open, it proved that there was insufficient business to pay for the line's operation. For many years the area served by the railway remained rural, and the hoped-for development in residential travel was very slow to take place. Although the pace accelerated in the twentieth century, the line remained loss-making; in 1913 LSWR statistical returns showed the line losing £5 per mile per week.

By 1909 there were twelve passenger trains each way on the line, including a small number from and to points south of Guildford running semi-fast through the new line, giving relief to the congestion at Woking. Some stopping trains did not run east of Surbiton. There were an additional nine trains running via Leatherhead to Waterloo.

Hampton Court Junction
Quadruple track had already been provided between Hampton Court Junction and Waterloo in 1885. The provision of four (or more) tracks all the way from Basingstoke was completed in 1905. In 1908 a burrowing junction was made at Hampton Court Junction, to enable the Up Cobham line to join the up main line there without conflicting with other movements.

Leatherhead connections
After 1923 a connection was made at Leatherhead enabling trains from Effingham Junction to run into the LBSCR station, and on 9 July 1927 the LSWR Leatherhead station was closed.

Electrification

The LSWR undertook a widespread scheme of electrification from 1913, and on 20 November 1916 the route to Claygate was energised. This short extension on to the New Line was probably to give an alternative turn-back location if Surbiton was congested. It had been intended to continue immediately to Guildford, but difficulties due to the war frustrated this, and in fact shortages of rolling stock forced the suspension of electric train movements to Claygate from June 1919. The Southern Railway resumed the electrification work, and on 12 July 1925 full electric services were working through to Guildford, and in addition on the Epsom – Leatherhead - Effingham Junction section.

Electric train service and its development since 1916

The section of the New Guildford line from London Waterloo to Claygate was the final suburban electrification carried out by the London and South Western Railway, with the first services using the 660 V DC third-rail system on 20 November 1916. The journey from Claygate to Guildford was then a steam hauled service. The journey from Waterloo to Claygate took 29 minutes on commencement of the electric service which was supplemented by steam hauled services during the mornings and evenings. The First World War halted the LSWR's electrification program, and the Claygate to Guildford electrification was completed under the auspices of the Southern Railway, with the first electric train arriving at Guildford station on 12 July 1925. A new bay platform, now Platform 1, was added at the north-east end of the station to cater for the electric trains as the Portsmouth line wouldn't be electrified until 1937. Until then down steam trains had used what is now Platform 2.

Currently electric train stock is stabled and serviced at Wimbledon and, until 1993, at Effingham Junction. The latter is now used by Colas Rail as a servicing centre for multiple-purpose track maintenance vehicles (MPV) for Network Rail. From electrification to the early 1960s train stock was formed of 3 and latterly 4 car 3SUB and 4SUB units. In the early 1940s a new 4SUB was introduced. For a while in the late 1950s and 1960s the line was the only route from Waterloo that had 4SUB units substituted by EPB units. For many years new train stock was tested for long periods on this route. New mainline 4LAV units were tried out in public service in the spring of 1932 on the Waterloo – Cobham – Guildford route, where a publicity shot was taken of a unit carrying headcode H with a bar above, the original route code for the line. The line received the first post-World War 2EPB electric stock that became the standard for British Railways Southern Region for many years. In January 1952, 4EPB set number 5001 entered service on the line.

For most of the life of the New Guildford line, only second (formerly known as third) or standard-class stock has been available. For a brief period starting in October 1973, first class service was provided but the total number of seats was much reduced from the former second class only stock, from 772 to 560 seats, and this resulted in much dissatisfaction due to the consequent overcrowding. During the period of first-class service, a number of trains ran as stopping services to and from Portsmouth. Very occasionally, during times of disrupted working, 4COR sets with 2HAL and 2BIL units that had been cascaded from the main line would be seen – the former causing substantial delays owing to the lack of doors for quick rush-hour loading.

Route codes for the line are 16 for trains via Epsom and 42 via Brentford.

Current services
At present on Monday to Saturday there are two trains per hour to Guildford.

There is one additional train during the morning peak period to London and conversely in the evening to Guildford on weekdays.  This extra train runs non-stop between London Waterloo and Surbiton in both directions. On Sundays there is just one train per hour in each direction.

Current rolling stock
Currently the services to Guildford and London Waterloo are using Class 455 sets built in the early to mid-1980s, which have now all undergone an extensive refurbishment program which was completed in 2008. Refurbished two-car sets of Class 456 formerly in service with Southern (Railway), were used from 2017 to extend peak hour services and some off peak services to ten-car operation. These were then withdrawn following the introduction of a reduced timetable on 17 January 2022.

Stations and locations

Main line
 Hampton Court Junction;
 Hinchley Wood; opened 20 October 1930
 Claygate, opened 2 February 1885
 Oxshott; opened 2 February 1885
 Cobham & Stoke d’Abernon; opened 2 February 1885
 Effingham Junction; opened 2 July 1888
 Horsley; opened 2 February 1885; still open
 Clandon & Ripley; opened 2 February 1885; renamed Clandon 1910
 London Road; opened 2 February 1885; renamed London Road, Guildford 9 July 1923
 Guildford; LSWR main line station; opened 5 May 1845

Leatherhead branch
 Leatherhead; LSWR station opened 4 March 1867; closed 10 July 1927, when trains were diverted to the former LBSCR station, still open
 Bookham; opened 2 February 1885
 Effingham Junction; above.

Accidents and incidents

1925
Shortly after the line to Guildford was electrified, there were three minor accidents.  In each case the drivers lost control of their trains due to unfamiliarity with the new style Westinghouse brake equipment. These incidents happened on 16, 23 and 31 July. The report of the Ministry of Transport Inspector notes that the three trains were all coming into the new terminal bay platform that had recently been installed for the electric services.

1953
On 18 September 1953, there was another incident of the same type as in 1925, when a train overran the buffers at Guildford and collided with the station offices, killing the assistant station master. Once again the driver was not familiar with the new type of brakes that had been introduced with the new train stock – this time 1951 electro pneumatic brake electric multiple units.

2010

On 5 November 2010, a lorry fell off a bridge over the railway line near Oxshott railway station, landing on the 3:05 pm South West Trains service from Guildford to London Waterloo. The lorry driver and one passenger suffered serious injuries; a further five passengers suffered minor injuries.

References

Further reading

 
 

Rail transport in Surrey
Railway lines opened in 1885
Railway lines in South East England
Standard gauge railways in England